(German for nail beam) is a competition in which participants compete against each other to drive nails into a wooden beam.  It can be found as a game of leisure at events and festivals, often for children and as a wedding custom.

History 
According to Florian Dering, a museologist at the Munich Stadtmuseum, the nail beam game as folk amusement has been around since the 1920s. This driving of nails into dimensional lumber has been used by showmen and charities to raise money, and also at weddings to have the newly married couple show their skills to the audience.

Dering reports a series of administrative regulations: the vertical cross-section of the plank should be at least 12 cm by 12 cm, and have no knots or protruding branches. Several hammers are used, each having a mass of at least 400 g and a handle length of at least 30 cm. The nails provided should have a round (but not smooth) head, and be at least two inches long. The nail bar is usually mounted at table height and secured to sawhorses by way of screw clamps.

Competitive nailing can be a solo game.  However, the most common form is as a competition between several individuals, the winner of which gets a prize.

For Expo 2000, the Bundesanstalt für Arbeitsschutz und Arbeitsmedizin in Dortmund presented the Exhibition Of The Labor World to demonstrate different aspects of workplace security.  A Nagelbalken area was provided to demonstrate a person's physical competence.  Among many other things at the exhibition, the "Living And Working World" area in which the nail bar appeared dealt with the intellectual, psychological, physical, and social competence of people, which was implemented scenographically in four so-called "elementary spaces":  four cubic, monomaterially formed spaces that were meant to arouse the senses by way of light, sounds, artistic ciphers, and smells.

Similar customs 

Craftsmen in German-speaking countries have driven nails into certain wooden shapes for luck for centuries, as in the case of the Stock im Eisen in Vienna, Austria. This art was used as a fund-raising tool during the First World War, when the craft was adapted as a means of gathering donations for war-time charities, in the form of Nail Men.  For a fee, a single nail could be partially driven into the figure.  When completed, the figure would be transformed from wood to metal.

References

Further reading

External links 
 Helge Normann, "Das Geheimnis des Nagelbalkens", Wochenspiegel, 26 June 2010 (with video) 
 Postenzettel (scorecard) for a Nagelbalken contest (PDF) 

Sports entertainment
Culture of Bavaria